{{DISPLAYTITLE:C7H7ClO}}
The molecular formula C7H7ClO (molar mass: 142.58 g/mol, exact mass: 142.0185 u) may refer to:

 2-Chloro-m-cresol
 p-Chlorocresol

Molecular formulas